The 2016 Puerto Rico gubernatorial election was held on November 8, 2016, to elect the Governor of Puerto Rico. The incumbent Popular Democratic Governor Alejandro García Padilla did not run for re-election. The election was won by Ricardo Rosselló, who received 41% of the vote in a four-way race.

Popular Democratic Party

Candidates

Declared
 David Bernier, former Secretary of State of Puerto Rico, former President of the Puerto Rico Olympic Committee and former Puerto Rico Secretary of Sports and Recreation

Declined
 Alejandro García Padilla, incumbent Governor

New Progressive Party primary

Candidates

Declared
 Pedro Pierluisi, Resident Commissioner of Puerto Rico and former Secretary of Justice of Puerto Rico
 Ricky Rosselló, activist, political commentator and son of former governor Pedro Rosselló
Ricky Rossello won the primaries of New Progressive Party by securing 51.09% votes against Pedro Pierluisi's 48.91% votes.

Puerto Rican Independence Party

Candidates

Declared
 María de Lourdes Santiago, state senator, attorney and journalist

Independent

Candidates

Declared
 Alexandra Lúgaro, attorney and businesswoman
 Manuel Cidre, businessman

Results

See also
 Puerto Rican general election, 2016
New Progressive Party of Puerto Rico primaries, 2016
Popular Democratic Party of Puerto Rico primaries, 2016

References

Gubernatorial election
2016
Puerto Rico